Social weaver can refer to any of three African birds:
 Sociable Weaver (Philetairus socius)
Grey-capped Social Weaver (Pseudonigrita arnaudi)
Black-capped Social Weaver (Pseudonigrita cabanisi)